The 1992 NBA draft took place on June 24, 1992, at Memorial Coliseum in Portland, Oregon. The draft is considered to be one of the deepest in NBA history. The top three picks (Shaquille O'Neal, Alonzo Mourning, Christian Laettner) were considered can't-miss prospects. All three are Hall of Famers; O'Neal and Mourning are (individual) player-inducted, whereas Laettner is team-inducted. Laettner made one All-Star game in his career and was an Olympic Gold Medalist on the 1992 Dream Team, but did not live up to the lofty expectations set for him. The trio would end up playing together on the 2005 Miami Heat. Two other players went on to become All-Stars (Tom Gugliotta once, Latrell Sprewell four times) and several others had solid careers (Jimmy Jackson, Robert Horry, Doug Christie, P.J. Brown, LaPhonso Ellis, Jon Barry, Walt Williams, Anthony Peeler, and Clarence Weatherspoon). Harold Miner, who was given the nickname "Baby Jordan" because of his similarities to Michael Jordan, slipped to number 12 and, other than winning two slam dunk contests, only had a brief, uneventful, and injury prone four-year career.

This was the first time the NBA draft was held outside of New York. It is the only draft where the first three picks were centers.

Draft selections

Notable undrafted players
These players were not selected in the 1992 NBA draft but have played at least one game in the NBA.

Early entrants

College underclassmen
The following college basketball players successfully applied for early draft entrance.

  Ameer Aziz – F, Saint Paul's (Virginia) (junior)
  John Beauford – C, Southern Poly (junior)
  Anthony Cade – F, Seminole JC (sophomore)
  Mark Chappell – G, Iowa State (junior)
  Dallas Lee Cothrum – G, Austin (junior)
  Jim Jackson – G, Ohio State (junior)
  Troy King – F, Beaver County CC (sophomore)
  Benny Maxwell – G, Western New Mexico (junior)
  Harold Miner – G, USC (junior)
  Tracy Murray – F, UCLA (junior)
  Shaquille O'Neal – C, LSU (junior)
  Melvin Robinson – C, Arizona State (junior)
  Tony Scott – F, Texas A&M (junior)
  Jeff Theiler – F, La Verne (junior)
  Mike Wawrzyniak – G, Cleveland State (junior)
  Marcus Webb – F, Alabama (junior)

See also
 List of first overall NBA draft picks

Notes

References

Draft
National Basketball Association draft
NBA draft
NBA draft
NBA draft
Basketball in Portland, Oregon
Events in Portland, Oregon